Falls Around Her is a 2018 Canadian drama film, directed by Darlene Naponse. The film stars Tantoo Cardinal as Mary Birchbark, an internationally famous First Nations musician who returns to her home community to recharge and reevaluate her life, only to find that her fame is not so easily left behind.

The cast also includes Tina Keeper, Gail Maurice, Johnny Issaluk and J.D. Nicholsen. The film was shot on the Atikameksheng Anishnawbek First Nation reserve near Sudbury, Ontario.

Despite Cardinal's long and distinguished career as an actress, Falls Around Her was her first-ever starring role as the main protagonist in a film.

The film premiered at the 2018 Toronto International Film Festival. It subsequently screened as the opening gala of the imagineNATIVE Film + Media Arts Festival in October, where it won the Air Canada Audience Choice Award. It opened commercially in April 2019.

References

External links
 
 
 Falls Around Her at Library and Archives Canada

2018 films
2018 drama films
Canadian drama films
First Nations films
Films shot in Greater Sudbury
Films set in Northern Ontario
2010s Canadian films